Rustlers' Hideout is a 1944 American Western film directed by Sam Newfield. In 1940 Crabbe had followed and replaced Bob Steele in the role of Billy the Kid in a series of B-Westerns. After 19 films as Billy, the character was renamed Billy Carson with seemingly no other changes to the series.  He even kept his sidekick (Al St. John) from the "Kid" films. This was the 14th of the Carson series out of a total of 23 (1940-1946).

Plot summary 
Billy and Fuzzy lead a cattle drive and face a gang of ruthless rustlers who use gambling debts and poisoning water holes to stop Billy's herd.

Cast 
Buster Crabbe as Billy Carson
Al St. John as Fuzzy Jones
Patti McCarty as Barbara Crockett
Charles King as Buck Shaw
John Merton as Harry Stanton
Terry Frost as Jack Crockett
Hal Price as Dave Crockett
Lane Chandler as Gambler Hammond
Al Ferguson as Henchman Steve
Frank McCarroll as Henchman Squint
Ed Cassidy as Sheriff
Falcon as Billy's Horse

Soundtrack

See also
The "Billy the Kid" films starring Buster Crabbe: 
 Billy the Kid Wanted (1941)
 Billy the Kid's Round-Up (1941)
 Billy the Kid Trapped (1942)
 Billy the Kid's Smoking Guns (1942)
 Law and Order (1942) 
 Sheriff of Sage Valley (1942) 
 The Mysterious Rider (1942)
 The Kid Rides Again (1943)
 Fugitive of the Plains (1943)
 Western Cyclone (1943)
 Cattle Stampede (1943)
 The Renegade (1943)
 Blazing Frontier (1943)
 Devil Riders (1943)
 Frontier Outlaws (1944)
 Valley of Vengeance (1944)
 The Drifter (1944) 
 Fuzzy Settles Down (1944)
 Rustlers' Hideout (1944)
 Wild Horse Phantom (1944)
 Oath of Vengeance (1944)
 His Brother's Ghost (1945) 
 Thundering Gunslingers (1945)
 Shadows of Death (1945)
 Gangster's Den (1945)
 Stagecoach Outlaws (1945)
 Border Badmen (1945)
 Fighting Bill Carson (1945)
 Prairie Rustlers (1945) 
 Lightning Raiders (1945)
 Terrors on Horseback (1946)
 Gentlemen with Guns (1946)
 Ghost of Hidden Valley (1946)
 Prairie Badmen (1946)
 Overland Riders (1946)
 Outlaws of the Plains (1946)

References

External links 
 
 

1945 films
1945 Western (genre) films
American Western (genre) films
American black-and-white films
Billy the Kid (film series)
1940s English-language films
Films directed by Sam Newfield
1940s American films